Halfsies was a breakfast cereal manufactured by Quaker Oats from 1979 through 1984. It was the result of the so-called "sugar backlash" in which the amount of sugar in children's breakfast cereals became an issue. Its premise was that it contained half the sugar of regular breakfast cereals, and that it was half-corn and half-rice. The cereal nuggets were shaped as half a normal cereal ring, like the letter C.

It was essentially Cap'n Crunch (another Quaker Oats product) with half the sugar and a slightly different texture.

The marketing campaign involved the fictional King of The Land of Half, who presided over The Land of Half. The box featured Half Land where houses, cars, food, etc. were all cut in half.

Halfsies was discontinued due to poor sales.

References

 New York Times article

External links
 Quaker Oats website

Quaker Oats Company cereals